Buck Spring Plantation, also known as the Nathaniel Macon House, is a historic plantation house site located near Vaughan, Warren County, North Carolina.  The property includes the graves of politician Nathaniel Macon (1757–1837) and his wife Hannah Plummer Mason, log corn crib, smokehouse, caretaker's house, and reconstructed dwelling house dated to the 1930s.

It was listed on the National Register of Historic Places in 1970.

References

External links
VisitNC.com: Buck Spring Plantation - Nathaniel Macon Homeplace

Plantation houses in North Carolina
Houses on the National Register of Historic Places in North Carolina
Houses in Warren County, North Carolina
National Register of Historic Places in Warren County, North Carolina